Brasilicereus is a genus of cacti known only from Brazil and comprising 2 species.

Species

References 

Cactoideae
Cactoideae genera
Cacti of South America
Endemic flora of Brazil